Lee Hong-man (born 25 January 1941) is a South Korean boxer. He competed in the men's welterweight event at the 1964 Summer Olympics. At the 1964 Summer Olympics, he lost to Michael Varley of Great Britain.

References

1941 births
Living people
South Korean male boxers
Olympic boxers of South Korea
Boxers at the 1964 Summer Olympics
Place of birth missing (living people)
Asian Games medalists in boxing
Boxers at the 1966 Asian Games
Asian Games gold medalists for South Korea
Medalists at the 1966 Asian Games
Welterweight boxers